Gammada Liyanage Cletus Paulinus Mendis, popularly as Cletus Mendis (born July 17, 1949 as ක්ලීටස් මෙන්ඩිස් Sinhala) is a Sri Lankan actor, mainly works in cinema and television. He has received a number of awards for portraying villains at the Sarasaviya, OCIC, Raigam, and Presidential film festivals.

His elder brother, Vinicius Mendis died in October 2019 at the age of 75.

Personal life
Cletus got married to Dorrin Jayakody in 1987 and they have a single son, who was born in 1994.

Acting career
In 1971, before moving to silver screen, Mendis did dramas at church feasts and taught gymnastics and martial arts to the youth at Katupotha. Then 1973, he went to Colombo to face an interview with Henry Chandrawansa and then met Sugath Samarakoone at that interview. In 1977, he worked as the stunt director of the film Wanagatha Kella.

His first cinema acting came in the 1978 epic history film Veera Puran Appu as a supporting actor. Then he acted in Yali Pipunu Malak in 1983. His first villain character came through the 1982 film Paramitha, which turned his filming career towards villain roles throughout the rest of the decades.

In 2004, Mendis joined Vishva Kala Sarasaviya at Mount Lavinia and met Udayakantha Warnasuriya. In 2021, he was honored with the 'Deshabhimani Keerthi Kalabushana' award.

Filmography
 No. denotes the Number of Sri Lankan film in the Sri Lankan cinema.

References

External links
 ජාතික රූපවාහිනියට කළු සෙවනැල්ලක්
 ජනක චමින්දගේ ‘අකඩවාරිය’ මේ දිනවල රූ ගැන්වේ
 ක්ලීටස් වේදිකා රංගනයක හතයි හතයි හතේ හතයි ඇරඹේ
 චම්පා ශ්‍රියාණි නැවතත් මිල්ලෑව වලව්ව ගෙදරට
 ‘Crime Scene’ marks the entry of detective thriller to local TV
 කවුද හිතුවේ දෙයියනේ මෙහෙම දෙයක් වේවි කියලා
 'Kadulu Thahanchiya': tussle over the lead role
 ගිය පාස්කුවත් දුකින් මේ පාස්කුවෙත් දුකින්

Sri Lankan male film actors
Sinhalese male actors
Living people
1948 births